The Will County Highway System is a county-maintained system of arterial county highways in Will County, Illinois, United States. They are marked with the standard M1-6 pentagon-shaped highway marker on the base of traffic signals at intersections with other county highways. They are not marked on any freeway or tollway exits or signed with separate reassurance markers. In addition, although concurrencies of county highways exist in the county, they too are not explicitly signed as such.

Route list

References 

Transportation in Will County, Illinois